The Graham Gouldman Thing is the debut album by singer-songwriter Graham Gouldman, later a founding member of 10cc.

Overview
Prior to the album's recording Graham Gouldman had established himself as a hit singles songwriter, with his most successful songs written for Herman's Hermits, The Yardbirds and The Hollies. On the album Gouldman delivered his own versions of several songs recorded by other musicians ("No Milk Today" by Herman's Hermits, "For Your Love" by The Yardbirds, "Bus Stop" by The Hollies, "Pamela, Pamela" and "The Impossible Years" by Wayne Fontana, "Behind the Door" by St. Louis Union and Cher) as well as his own new compositions.

Gouldman recorded the album at Olympic Studios in London, a studio that would later be extensively used by Led Zeppelin. It was recorded with the assistance of John Paul Jones and Eddie Kramer, and both of whom would also achieve considerable success with Led Zeppelin. The liner notes acknowledge the use of "some fabulous players on the sessions", but do not name them. In sleeve notes for the 2004 CD re-release, Gouldman said his manager Harvey Lisberg suggested he make the album, reworking his hits and recording new songs.

The album was originally released only in the US and Canada with only one single released in the UK. It was made available in the UK for the first time on CD in 1992.

Track listing
All songs composed by Graham Gouldman

Side 1
 "The Impossible Years" – 2:38
 "Bus Stop" – 2:24
 "Behind the Door" – 3:38
 "Pawnbroker" – 3:02
 "Who are They" – 2:03
 "My Father" – 2:47
Side 2
 "No Milk Today" – 2:15
 "Upstairs, Downstairs" – 2:17
 "For Your Love" – 2:34
 "Pamela, Pamela" – 2:11
 "Chestnut" – 3:23

Personnel
Graham Gouldman - vocals, guitar
John Paul Jones - arrangements
Clem Cattini - drums
Technical
Eddie Kramer - engineer
Bill Inglot - sleeve design

References

Graham Gouldman albums
1968 debut albums
Albums arranged by John Paul Jones (musician)
Albums produced by Graham Gouldman
RCA Victor albums
Albums recorded at Olympic Sound Studios